Vanamõisa is a village in Kose Parish, Harju County in northern Estonia.

References
 

Villages in Harju County